The Heart of the Ocean is the name of a fictional blue diamond featured prominently in the 1997 film Titanic.

Heart of the Ocean may also refer to:
 Heart Of The Ocean: The Film Music of James Horner, a 1998 album by James Horner
 "Heart of Ocean", a song by Gaelic Storm from the 1999 album Herding Cats

See also
 Ocean's Heart, a 2003 album by Dreamtale
 Heart of the Sea (disambiguation)